Christopher G. Hoban (May 7, 1962 – October 18, 1988) was a New York City Police Department officer who, while working undercover, was killed in the line of duty.

Early life
Hoban was born in Brooklyn, New York, on May 7, 1962.  He attended Our Lady of Perpetual Help Elementary School and Xaverian High School in Brooklyn, and graduated from John Jay College in Manhattan in 1984.

He lived with his parents, Catina and Martin Hoban and brothers, Martin and Tommy.

Career
Hoban served on the NYC Police Department for four years. He was assigned to Manhattan North Narcotics, and his shield number was 25547. In less than four years service he received four commendations for his work.

On October 18, 1988, at 7:00 P.M., Hoban and another undercover police narcotics officer, Michael Jermyn, entered an apartment on West 105th Street in Manhattan, ostensibly to make a narcotics purchase along with two suspects. Upon entry into the apartment, they encountered a third suspect. During the transaction the suspects began to suspect officer's Hoban and Jermyn were police officers and demanded to search officer Jermyn and discovered his service weapon. Officer Hoban drew his sidearm and, in the ensuing close-quarters shootout, Hoban was killed by gunshot wounds to the chest and head. One of the suspects was also killed at the scene by Hoban, while a second was immediately apprehended by officers waiting outside the building. 

That evening another NYPD officer, Michael Buczek, was killed while trying to arrest two suspects on a drugs charge in apartment building at 580 West 161st Street in Washington Heights in Manhattan.

It was the first time in the history of the NYPD that two officers were killed in separate incidents on the same night. Hoban and Buczek did not know each other, but they held a joint funeral Mass at Our Lady of Perpetual Help in Brooklyn on October 22, 1988. Twelve thousand officers and nearly 8,000 civilians attended the joint funeral.

The drug dealer that fired the shots that killed Hoban was arrested in Puerto Rico nine days after the shooting by the FBI. In 1990, Bienvenido Castillo, 25, was found guilty of killing a police officer and sentenced to 57 years and 2 months in jail. He will not be eligible for parole until he is 82 years old. The two other suspects were both sentenced to 25 years to life in prison for their roles in the murder.

Memorials
Every September since 1989, Hoban is remembered in Bay Ridge, Brooklyn and his alma mater, Xaverian High School with the Chris Hoban five mile run. The proceeds from the run fund the Hoban Scholarship at Xaverian High School which provides tuition assistance to children of police officers.

In October 1996, New York City Mayor Rudolph Giuliani renamed 71st Street between Narrows Avenue and Shore Road to Chris Hoban Way. The street is adjacent to Xaverian High School where Hoban attended high school.

He has been commemorated at various times  at Our Lady of Perpetual Help Church and also in NYPD memorials.

In October 2008, twenty years after the deaths of Hoban and Buczek, they were honored at a memorial Mass at St. Elizabeth's Catholic Church.

The NYPD named a little league baseball team in honor of Hoban.

References

New York City Police Department officers
American police officers killed in the line of duty
1962 births
1988 deaths
John Jay College of Criminal Justice alumni
People from Brooklyn